Give a dog a bad name and hang him is an English proverb.  Its meaning is that if a person's reputation has been besmirched, then he will suffer difficulty and hardship.  A similar proverb is he that has an ill name is half hanged.

The proverb dates back to the 18th century or before.  In 1706, John Stevens recorded it as "Give a Dog an ill name and his work is done".  In 1721, James Kelly had it as a Scottish proverb – "Give a Dog an ill Name, and he'll soon be hanged. Spoken of those who raise an ill Name on a Man on purpose to prevent his Advancement."  In Virginia, it appeared as an old saying in the Norfolk Herald in 1803 – "give a dog a bad name and hang him".

The observation is due to negativity bias – that people are apt to think poorly of others on weak evidence.  This is then reinforced by confirmation bias as people give more weight to evidence that supports a  preconception than evidence which contradicts it.

See also
 Character assassination
 Scapegoat

References

1700s neologisms
Bullying
Defamation
English proverbs